Bullet Prakash  (2 April 1976 – 6 April 2020) was an Indian actor who worked in Kannada cinema. Known for portraying comic roles, Prakash appeared in over 325 films. He earned the nickname "Bullet" because he used to ride the motorbike, Royal Enfield Bullet. In 2015, Prakash joined the Bharatiya Janata Party.

Prakash appeared in films such as Mast Maja Maadi (2008), Aithalakkadi (2010), Mallikarjuna (2011) and Aryan (2014). He also appeared in a Tulu film, Soombe.

Partial filmography 

 A. K. 47 (1997)
 Yuvaraja (2001)...Raju's friend
 Dhruva (2002)
 Don (2003)
 Partha (2003)
 Bidalaare (2004)...car driver
 Omkara (2004)
 Ambi (2006)
 Shree (2006)
 Baa Bega Chandamama (2008)
 Mast Maja Maadi (2008)
 Venki (2009)
 Ee Sambhashane (2009)
 Aithalakkadi (2010)
 Jackie (2010)
 Mallikarjuna (2011)
 Sri Kshetra Adi Chunchanagiri (2012)
 Devarane (2013)
 Rajani Kantha (2013)
 Parari (2013)
 Jataayu (2013)
 Shatru (2013)
 Jungle Jackie (2013)
 Dhanu (2013)
 Savaal (2014)
 Love Show (2014)
 Manada Mareyalli (2014)
 Nimbe Huli (2014)
 Pungi Daasa (2014)
 Rose (2014)
 Aryan (2014)
 Tirupathi Express (2014)
 Master Mind (2015)
 Rhaatee (2015) ... Jagganna
 Just Maduveli (2015)
 Daksha (2015)
 Bombay Mittai (2015)
 Pataragitti (2015)
 Red Alert (2015)
 Male (2015)
 Luv U Alia (2015)
 Mr. Airavata (2015)
 Ganga (2015)
 Bettanagere (2015)
 Alone (2015)
 Kathe Chitrakathe Nirdeshana Puttanna (2016)
 Maduveya Mamatheya Kareyole (2016)
 Bheeshma (2016)
 Akira (2016)
 Jaggu Dada (2016)
 Mumbai (2017)
 Jalsa (2017)
 Soundarya Nilaya (2017)
 Saheba (2017)
 Mari Tiger (2018)
 Rajasimha (2018)
 Bhootayyana Mommaga Ayyu (2018)
 Ibbaru B.Tech Students Journey (2019)
 Jerk (2019)
 Pogaru (2021)
 Gaalipata 2 (2022)

Death 
Prakash died on 6 April 2020 at the age of 44 due to acute liver failure and kidney failure.

References

External links
 

Male actors in Kannada cinema
Indian male film actors
2020 deaths
Indian actor-politicians
1976 births
Politicians from Bangalore
21st-century Indian male actors
Male actors from Bangalore
Bigg Boss Kannada contestants
Deaths from kidney failure
Deaths from liver failure